West Winch is a village and civil parish in the English county of Norfolk.
For the purposes of local government, it falls within the district of King's Lynn and West Norfolk.

The village's name means 'pasture (specialised) farm'. 'West' to distinguish from East Winch.

West Winch is situated on the A10 several miles south of the town of King's Lynn. The most celebrated feature is a windmill (at ) that was restored from dereliction between 1973 and 1980 and is now complete with sails.  Cartoonist Osbert Lancaster is buried in the church graveyard, having previously opened the William Burt Social Club in 1974.  A plaque on the club's wall commemorates this event.   A range of recycling facilities are adjacent to the club. West Winch Primary School received a 'good' rating from Ofsted in 2014.

Governance
An electoral ward in the same name exists. The population of this ward at the 2011 Census was 4,734.

References

External links 

West Winch Windmill
West Winch Primary School website
GENUKI(tm) page
West Winch Parish Council Website

Villages in Norfolk
Civil parishes in Norfolk
King's Lynn and West Norfolk